Advani Lakshmi Devi is a retired Indian actress known for her work in Kannada cinema. She has played a variety of roles such as heroine, vamp, mother, grandmother in hundreds of Kannada movies over the last 50 years. Her role in films Gandhada Gudi (1973) and Sri Srinivasa Kalyana (1974) as mother (male role played by Rajkumar) is much remembered.  She is the mother of veteran actress Roopadevi who acted in many Kannada movies with Rajkumar such as Haalu Jenu (1982),  Samayada Gombe (1984) and Yarivanu (1984). Rajkumar holds the distinction of having played hero and son's role with her. Rajkumar] holds the distinction of having played the hero to both Roopadevi (in 3 films) and her mother Advani Lakshmi Devi (in Sri Ramanjaneya Yuddha (1963)). Lakshmi Devi recently honoured with Rajkumar lifetime achievement award 2016 by the state government of Karnataka.

Awards
 2017 – M. V. Rajamma Award by the Karnataka Chalanachitra Academy.
 2016 – Dr. Rajkumar Award by the Karnataka Government.
1973–74 -Karnataka State Film Award for Best Supporting Actress – Gandhada Gudi

Filmography
1994	Gandhada Gudi Part 2
1985	Jwalamukhi
1984	Shravana Banthu
1983	Mududida Thavare Aralithu
1982	Baadada Hoo
1982	Chalisuva Modagalu
1980	Janma Janmada Anubandha
1980	Moogana Sedu
1980	Rama Parashurama
1980	Rustum Jodi
1979	Chandanada Gombe
1978	Madhura Sangama
1977	Lakshmi Nivasa
1976	Bahaddur Gandu
1976	Bayalu Daari
1976	Mugiyada Kathe
1975	Mayura
1975	Nireekshe
1974	Eradu Kanasu
1974	Sri Srinivasa Kalyana
1974	Upasane
1973	Gandhada Gudi
1973	Seetheyalla Savithri
1972	Bangaarada Manushya
1972	Bhale Huchcha
1972	Nanda Gokula
1971	Bhale Adrushtavo Adrushta
1971	Namma Samsara
1971	Paapa Punya (Parvathi)
1971	Sharapanjara
1970	Anireekshitha
1970	Karulina Kare (Gowri)
1970	Mooru Muttugalu
1970	Mruthyu Panjaradalli Goodachari 555
1970	Takka Bitre Sikka (Jaya)
1969	Bhageerathi
1969	Kappu Bilupu
1969	Makkale Manege Manikya
1969	Mallammana Pavada
1969	Mukunda Chandra
1969	Namma Makkalu
1968	Bhagya Devathe
1966	Mantralaya Mahatme (Gopi)
1964	Chandavalliya Thota
1964	Kalaavati
1964	Veera Sankalpa
1963	Jeevana Taranga
1963	Kalitharu Henne
1963	Sri Ramanjaneya Yuddha (Seetha)
1962	Bhoodaana
1962	Karuneye Kutumbada Kannu
1962	Thejaswini
1960	Dashavathara (Lakshmi, Seete, Rukmini)
1959	Jagajyothi Basaveshwara
1959	Abba Aa Hudugi
1958	Mane Thumbida Hennu 
1958	Mangala Suthra
1957	Shukradese
1956	Bhakta Vijaya

References

Indian film actresses
Living people
Actresses in Kannada cinema
Year of birth missing (living people)
20th-century Indian actresses
21st-century Indian actresses
Actresses from Karnataka